Hebeloma fastibile is a species of mushroom in the family Hymenogastraceae.

References

External links
 

fastibile
Fungi of Europe
Taxa named by Christiaan Hendrik Persoon